Sven Borrman (22 August 1933 – 29 May 2004) was a Swedish weightlifter. He competed in the men's light heavyweight event at the 1960 Summer Olympics.

References

External links
 

1933 births
2004 deaths
People from Lääne-Nigula Parish
Swedish male weightlifters
Olympic weightlifters of Sweden
Weightlifters at the 1960 Summer Olympics
Estonian people of Swedish descent 
Estonian World War II refugees
Estonian emigrants to Sweden